Nelson Wallace "Nels" Nitchman (December 21, 1908 – March 4, 1991) was an American football, basketball, and baseball coach.  He served as the head football coach at Union College in Schenectady, New York, from 1936 to 1940, at Colby College in 1941, and at the United States Coast Guard Academy from 1946 to 1958.  Nitchman was also the head basketball coach at Union from 1933 to 1941 and at the Coast Guard Academy from 1942 to 1954, tallying a career college basketball mark of 130–146.

Coaching career
Nitchman was the head football coach at the United States Coast Guard Academy in New London, Connecticut.  He held that position for 13 seasons, from 1946 until 1958. His coaching record at Coast Guard was 45–43–5.

Death
Nitchman died on March 4, 1991, in Waterford, Connecticut.

References

1908 births
1991 deaths
American men's basketball players
Coast Guard Bears baseball coaches
Coast Guard Bears football coaches
Coast Guard Bears men's basketball coaches
Colby Mules football coaches
Union Dutchmen baseball players
Union Dutchmen basketball coaches
Union Dutchmen basketball players
Union Dutchmen football coaches
Union Dutchmen football players